After a gap of five years the fourth team of English cricketers toured the West Indies in the 1901-02 season. The team was organized by H. D. G. Leveson Gower, who was unable to tour, and captained by Mr. R. A. Bennett. Like earlier touring parties it consisted solely of amateurs. They played a total of 19 matches, of which 13 are regarded as first-class, between January and April 1902.

Touring party
A party of just 11 was taken:

Mr. R.A. Bennett, Captain
Mr. R.N.R. Blaker
Mr. B.J.T. Bosanquet
Mr. T.H.K. Dashwood
Mr. E.W. Dillon
Mr. E.M. Dowson
Mr. F.L. Fane
Mr. F.H. Hollins
Mr. E.C. Lee
Mr. A.D. Whatman
Mr. E.R. Wilson

Mr. Lionel Gough Arbuthnot played a number of matches and must have accompanied the tourists. Whatman was the only one of the tourists to have been on one of the earlier tours, having been part of Lord Hawke's team in 1896-97 but had not played any first class cricket between the two tours. Bennett himself and Dashwood had not played first class cricket since 1899 but the remaining eight had played in 1901. Many of the tourists were ex-Oxbridge cricketers, five of them having played in the 1901 Oxford v Cambridge match. The team was younger than the previous touring sides and although inexperienced was at least the standard of the two 1896-97 teams. Wilson received a telegram on his arrival announcing the death of his mother and Dowson was also unavailable for the first game having a cold. Even with Arbuthnot playing an additional player was required and J.A. Davenport made up the 11. A.G. Robinson played in a minor match on the tour.

Bosanquet, Dowson and Wilson had been amongst the team that had recently toured North America in September and October 1901.

The team left Southampton on January 8.

Matches
Matches played were:

 January 22, 23, 24 : v Barbados
 January 25 : v United Services (in Barbados), a fill-up game
 January 27, 28 : v Barbados
 January 29, 30 : v West Indies (in Barbados)
 January 31, February 1 : v W. Bowring's XI (in Barbados), a fill-up game
 February 8, 10 : v Jamaica
 February 11 : v XVI Colts (in Jamaica), an odds match
 February 12, 13 : v Jamaica Born
 February 14, 15 : v Jamaica
 February 18, 19 : v St. Elizabeth C.C. (in Jamaica), 12-a-side
 February 21, 22 : v Combined Jamaica/United Services XI (in Jamaica)
 March 5, 6 : v Grenada & St. Vincent (in Grenada)
 March 6, 7 : v Grenada & St. Vincent (in Grenada)
 March 10, 11, 12 : v Trinidad, 12-a-side
 March 14, 15 : v Trinidad, 12-a-side
 March 20, 21 : v West Indies (in Trinidad)
 March 31, April 1, 2 : v British Guiana
 April 4, 5, 7 : v West Indies (in British Guiana)
 April 7, 8, 9, 10 : v British Guiana

First class matches are highlighted.

Of the 13 first class matches, 8 were won and 5 lost. Overall 13 matches were won, 5 lost and 1 drawn. The standard of cricket was noticeably weaker in Jamaica than in Barbados and all 6 matches there were won, several by an innings.

With Dowson and Wilson unavailable for the first game against Barbados the tourists' bowling was very weak and they lost heavily. They gained revenge in the second match with a full bowling attack. The West Indies side in the third game consisted of players from Trinidad, British Guiana and Barbados and was won by the West Indies. Two further matches against a combined team were played in Trinidad and British Guiana, the West Indies winning the match in Trinidad and the tourists that in British Guiana.

Wilson, Dowson and Bosanquet were the most successful bowlers. Bosanquet led the batting with 623 runs in the first class games at an average of 34. Dowson scored the only first class century by the tourists with 112 against the West Indies in British Guiana.

Averages

The following averages are in the 13 first class matches (Batting Bowling).

Batting

Bowling

References

External links
 R.A. Bennett's XI in West Indies: Jan-Apr 1902 at Cricinfo
 R. A. Bennett's XI in West Indies 1901-02 at CricketArchive

Annual reviews
 Wisden Cricketers' Almanack 1903

Further reading
 Peter Wynne-Thomas, The Complete History of Cricket Tours at Home & Abroad, Guild, 1989
 Cricket - A Weekly Record of the Game 1902

1902 in English cricket
1902 in West Indian cricket
1901-02
International cricket competitions from 1888–89 to 1918
West Indian cricket seasons from 1890–91 to 1917–18